San Nicola da Crissa is a comune (municipality) in the Province of Vibo Valentia in the Italian region Calabria, located about  southwest of Catanzaro and about  east of Vibo Valentia.

San Nicola da Crissa borders the following municipalities: Capistrano, Filogaso, Torre di Ruggiero, Vallelonga.

Demographic evolution

References

External links
 

Cities and towns in Calabria